Roberto Francisco Ferrería Paz (born 5 June 1953) is a Uruguayan Brazilian Roman Catholic bishop.

Ordained to the priesthood on 16 December 1989, Ferrería Paz was named bishop of the Roman Catholic Diocese of Campos, Brazil on 19 December 2007.

References 

1953 births
Living people
People from Montevideo
21st-century Roman Catholic bishops in Brazil
Uruguayan emigrants to Brazil
Roman Catholic bishops of Campos